Kenneth Michael McDonald (born March 4, 1970) is an American professional basketball coach, currently working as the Director of Student-Athlete Development at the University of Tennessee. He previously served as a head coach with the Austin Toros of the NBA Development League and at Western Kentucky University.

McDonald spent  from 2004 to 2008 at Texas under Rick Barnes. He previously worked as an assistant at Western Kentucky under Dennis Felton, from 1998–2003, helping the Hilltoppers reach the NCAA tournament during his final three seasons with the program. McDonald has one daughter, Ella, born January 28, 2008.

On January 6, 2012, Western Kentucky University released McDonald from his contract, citing lackluster attendance and a 5–11 start to the 2011–12 season. The firing came after a controversial game the previous night, which allowed Louisiana–Lafayette a game-winning shot with six players on the court during overtime.  The error was discovered immediately after the game. Coach McDonald and athletic director Ross Bjork contested the results at the scorer's table. However, officials declined to review the incident due to NCAA rules. He was replaced by assistant coach Ray Harper in interim, who was eventually named head coach moving forward.

In September 2013, he was promoted from assistant to head coach of the Austin Toros. On July 27, 2015, he signed a contract extension with the now Austin Spurs.

On April 12, 2018, McDonald was hired as an assistant coach for the Tulsa Golden Hurricane men's basketball team, working under head coach Frank Haith.

Head coaching record

College

 ‡ Fired on January 6, 2012; Ray Harper finished the season as interim head coach with an 11–5 record, making Western Kentucky's cumulative record in the 2011–12 season 16–19 (7–9, 3rd in Sun Belt).

NBA Development League

|- 
| align="left" |AUS
| align="left" |2013–14
|50||19||31|||| 6th in Central ||–||–||–||–|| align="center"|Missed Playoffs
|- 
| align="left" |AUS
| align="left" |2014–15
|50||32||18|||| 1st in Southwest ||6||4||2|||| align="center"|Lost in D-League Semifinals
|-
| align="left" |AUS
| align="left" |2015–16
|50||30||20|||| 1st in Southwest ||6||4||2|||| align="center"|Lost in D-League Semifinals
|-
| align="left" |AUS
| align="left" |2016–17
|50||25||25|||| 4th in Southwest||–||–||–||–|| align="center"|Missed Playoffs
|-

|-class="sortbottom"
| align="left" |Career
| || 200||106||94|||| ||12||8||4||||

References

External links
Western Kentucky profile

1970 births
Living people
American men's basketball coaches
American men's basketball players
Austin Spurs coaches
Austin Toros coaches
Basketball coaches from Rhode Island
Basketball players from Rhode Island
Clemson Tigers men's basketball coaches
College men's basketball head coaches in the United States
Georgia Bulldogs basketball coaches
Junior college men's basketball players in the United States
Point guards
Providence Friars men's basketball players
Shooting guards
Sportspeople from Providence, Rhode Island
Texas Longhorns men's basketball coaches
Tulsa Golden Hurricane men's basketball coaches
Western Kentucky Hilltoppers basketball coaches